This is a categorised list of places in the principal area of Gwynedd, north Wales. See the list of places in Wales for places in other principal areas.

Administrative divisions

Electoral wards

Since 2004 there have been 71 county electoral wards in Gwynedd.

Arfon

Dwyfor

Meirionnydd

Communities
This is a list of local communities:

Regions
 Llŷn Peninsula
 Northern Snowdonia (Snowdonia proper)
 Southern Snowdonia (the southern part of the Snowdonia National Park)

See also
 List of places in Gwynedd for all villages, towns and cities in Gwynedd.

References

Gwynedd